The Wehra Valley Railway (German: Wehratalbahn) was a 19.7 km long branch line from Schopfheim to Bad Säckingen in southwestern Germany, that was electrified in 1913 at the same time as the Wiesen Valley Railway.  For part of its length it followed the river of the same name. The line runs through the Fahrnau Tunnel (Fahrnauer Tunnel) which, at that time, was one of the longest railway tunnels (3.169 km) in Germany. The Wehra Valley Railway was intended as a strategic railway circumnavigating Switzerland near Basle and was laid ready to take a second track.

Passenger services were withdrawn from the line on 23 May 1971. Goods traffic between Bad Säckingen and Wehr continued to run until 1 September 1990. On 31 December 1994 the line was closed.

In a local council meeting on 19 April 2005, the town of Wehr (Baden) called for an expert opinion to determine whether the line could be reactivated. The report from Tübingen-based local transport advisor Ulrich Grosse was positive, although its restoration would be relatively expensive and only possible for a short time. Initially the route will be protected from being built on. Currently checks are being carried out to see whether the Fahrnau Tunnel can be reopened.

External links 

 Comprehensive information by the Eisenbahnfreunden Wehratal e.V.
 Information on the route on Reiner Schruft's home page
 Info at suedbadenbahn.de
 Report on the reactivation in the Südkurier newspaper
 Photos from inside the tunnel

Railway lines in Baden-Württemberg
Strategic railways